"4 Segundos"  is a song written and produced by Amaia Montero for her 2008 debut solo album Amaia Montero. It was released as the album's second internationally released single in 2009.

Charts and certifications

Charts
"4 Segundos" peaked at #9 in Spain.

Certifications

References

2008 songs
Songs written by Amaia Montero
2009 singles
Sony BMG singles